John Guy Chewings (14 April 1920 – 12 September 1994) was a New Zealand politician of the National Party.

Biography
Chewings was born in 1920 at Invercargill. He received his education at Waitaki Boys' High School. During World War II, he was a flying instructor for the Royal New Zealand Air Force. He later took up farming in Mossburn.
 
He represented Invercargill until 1972, when he was defeated. He was one of four National Party incumbents from Otago and Southland who lost their normally blue electorate to the Labour challenger over the proposed raising of the lake levels of lakes Manapouri and Te Anau, which was opposed by the Save Manapouri campaign. Labour's election manifesto was for the lakes to remain at their natural levels.

The year after his defeat, he moved to Whangarei. In 1990, Chewings was awarded the New Zealand 1990 Commemoration Medal.

Notes

References

1920 births
1994 deaths
People from Invercargill
People educated at Waitaki Boys' High School
New Zealand National Party MPs
Members of the New Zealand House of Representatives
New Zealand MPs for South Island electorates
Unsuccessful candidates in the 1972 New Zealand general election
New Zealand military personnel of World War II